Associated Independent Recording (AIR) is an independent recording company founded in London in 1965 by record producer Sir George Martin and his business partner John Burgess, after their departure from Parlophone. The studio complex was founded in 1969. Since then AIR has operated its own professional audio recording facilities, AIR Studios.

Oxford Street, London (1970–1991) 
AIR's first facility opened on 6 October 1970. It was located on the fourth floor of 214 Oxford Street, at Oxford Circus, containing four studios and (later) a MIDI programming room. The facility included two large studios (one 58×32 feet, the other 30×28 feet) and two small ones. The studios contained two Bösendorfer pianos, many soundproof booths, and a 56-channel mixing console, custom-designed by Neve Electronics to AIR's specification.

AIR London became popular in the 1970s for spoken word recordings. It also became one of the most in-demand music studios in London by 1973.

AIR Montserrat (1979–1989)  

The company built another recording studio on the Caribbean island of Montserrat, on Friths Road in the town of Salem. Martin lived in Olveston House, also in Salem.   AIR Montserrat opened in July 1979. The first album cut in the newly opened studios was Real to Reel by the Climax Blues Band in 1979.

Jimmy Buffett recorded Volcano at the Montserrat studio in May 1979, naming the album and its title song for the then dormant Soufrière Hills volcano on the island. Elton John recorded three albums at the Montserrat studio in the 1980s. Dire Straits recorded their hugely successful Brothers in Arms album at the studio between 1984 and 1985. Amongst other well-known studio clients were: the Police (Ghost in the Machine and Synchronicity), Earth, Wind & Fire, Ultravox, Orchestral Manoeuvres in the Dark (Pre-recorded Junk Culture), Paul McCartney, Gerry Rafferty, Rush,  The Rolling Stones, Black Sabbath, Midge Ure, Little River Band, Duran Duran, Sheena Easton and Luther Vandross.

Equipment-wise, as of 1979 the studio consisted of a 46-channel Neve console, a pair of MCI 24-track recorders, three Ampex ATR-102 stereo machines and an MCI synchronizer (for any 46-track work), with JBL and Tannoy monitors.

In 1986, the studio equipment list read, in part:

"Recently refurbished control room now featuring 60 channels by SSL with automation and TR and 12 fully integrated channels by Rupert Neve of Focusrite, two 32track Mitsubishi X850 digital machines and 24track Studer A800. Digital mixing on two Mitsubishi X86. Very comprehensive ancillary equipment list."

In 1989, shortly after the Rolling Stones had recorded their Steel Wheels album there, Hurricane Hugo devastated the island but the Montserrat studio facility sustained only minor damage. The studio was never reopened, mainly due to changes in the recording industry.

According to George Martin,

As of 2021, the abandoned studio buildings are still standing but have been long neglected and have fallen into dereliction; their roofs are failing, leading to extensive damage to the floors of the accommodation area and inner part of the studio complex, making them unsafe to walk on. The facility is now a modern ruin and is closed to the public. Olveston House operates as a guest house.

The 2021 Australian documentary film Under the Volcano interviews more than a dozen major artists and technicians who worked in the studio during the 1980s, and also includes archival narration and commentary by George Martin.

AIR Lyndhurst Hall, Hampstead (1991–present) 

In 1991, with the lease on the Oxford Street premises coming to an end, AIR Studios took over Lyndhurst Road Congregational Church, a Grade II listed building designed in 1880 by Victorian architect Alfred Waterhouse and located in the Hampstead suburb of north London. The space was revamped as a recording facility and opened for business in December 1992. AIR Lyndhurst is now a key London facility for classical and popular recordings, as well as film scores, television post-production, and dialogue, sound effects and music for video games. Spitfire Audio have recorded many of their digital audio samples here too. Employees include Olga Fitzroy.

See also 
 :Category:Albums recorded at AIR Studios

References

External links 
 AIR Studios website
 philsbook.com / AIR Studios
 Video tour and producer interviews shot at Air Studios

Recording studios in London
George Martin
Mass media companies established in 1965
Music production companies